Blackstock is a surname. Notable people with the surname include:

Brandon Blackstock, music manager and husband of Kelly Clarkson
Darryl Blackstock (born 1983), American football linebacker
Dexter Blackstock (born 1986), English footballer
George Tate Blackstock (1856–1921), lawyer born in Newcastle, Upper Canada
Oni Blackstock, American physician
Terri Blackstock (born 1957), Christian fiction writer
Thomas M. Blackstock (1834–1913), American businessman and politician
Tommy Blackstock (1882–1907), Scottish footballer
Uché Blackstock, American physician

Fictional characters:
Bernice Blackstock maiden name of Bernice Thomas, fictional character from the British soap opera Emmerdale
Diane Blackstock former name of Diane Sugden, fictional character on the ITV soap opera Emmerdale
Gareth Blackstock, character that appeared on the BBC sitcom Chef!
Lord Blackstock, fictional character in the Wildstorm comic book Planetary by Warren Ellis
Maureen Blackstock, fictional character on the ITV soap opera Emmerdale
Nicola Blackstock maiden name of Nicola King, fictional character in the British ITV soap opera Emmerdale
Rodney Blackstock, fictional character on the ITV soap opera Emmerdale